Liesl Jobson is a South African poet and musician.

She received first prize in the Inglis House Poetry Contest 2003 and her poetry was performed at the "Art of Survival" exhibition of the University of Alaska Fairbanks' Women's Art Group. She was the Focus Poet for Timbila 2005 and her poetry appears in numerous journals online and in print. She won the  2005 People Opposing Women Abuse Poetry Competition and has been awarded the 2006 Ernst van Heerden Creative Writing Award for her flash fiction.

Jobson is the poetry editor at the online magazine Mad Hatters' Review.

Bibliography

Prose poems and flash fiction
 100 papers (2008)View from an Escalator (2008)External links
 Interview in SmokeLong Quarterly, June 15, 2004
 Interview in SmokeLong Quarterly, October 15, 2004
 "Missive from Shakaland" in Mad Hatters' Review
 "Green Socks, White Lies" in SmokeLong Quarterly, June 15, 2004
 "Shopping List" in SmokeLong Quarterly, October 15, 2004
 "Two Fictions" in elimae "The Captain's Hat" in Pindeldyboz "Journal of a Premmie" in FRiGG Magazine "View from an Escalator and 100 Papers" in Book Southern Africa "100 PAPERS by Liesl Jobson Reviewed by Lalo Fox" in Mad Hatters' Review'', Issue 10, Fall 2008

References

South African women poets
South African musicians
Year of birth missing (living people)
Living people